was a Japanese professional footballer who played as a midfielder for Nippon Kokan, Yomiuri and the Japan national team.

Club career
Asaoka was born in Tokyo on 6 April 1962. After graduating from the University of Tsukuba, he joined Nippon Kokan in 1985. Starting in 1985, the club won second place for three years in a row. He was also selected Best Eleven 1985–86. He moved to Yomiuri in 1988. The club won the league championship in 1990–91. He retired in 1991.

International career
In April 1987, Asaoka was selected in Japan national team for 1988 Summer Olympics qualification. At this qualification, on 12 April, he debuted against Singapore. He played 8 games for Japan until 1989.

Death
Asaoka died on 6 October 2021, aged 59.

Career statistics

Club

International

References

External links

Japan National Football Team Database

1962 births
2021 deaths
University of Tsukuba alumni
Association football people from Tokyo
Japanese footballers
Association football midfielders
Japan international footballers
Japan Soccer League players
NKK SC players
Tokyo Verdy players